The 2018-19 season was the 25th season for the Ontario Junior Hockey League.

Team Changes
The Orangeville Flyers relocated to Brampton Ontario and were renamed the Brampton Admirals
The Milton Icehawks relocated to Brantford Ontario and were renamed the Brantford 99ers.

Standings 
Note: GP = Games played; W = Wins; L = Losses; OTL = Overtime losses; SL = Shootout losses; GF = Goals for; GA = Goals against; PTS = Points; x = clinched playoff berth; y = clinched division title; z = clinched conference title

North West Conference

South East Conference

Playoffs

External links 
 Ontario Junior Hockey League
 Canadian Junior Hockey League
 OJHL Playoffs 2019 - Brackets

Ontario Junior Hockey League seasons
OJHL